{{Infobox film
| name           = Finding Your Feet
| image          = Finding Your feet - eOne official U.K Theatrical poster.jpg
| caption        = Theatrical release poster
| director       = Richard Loncraine
| writer         = 
| producer       = 
| starring       = 
| cinematography = John Pardue
| editing        = Johnny Daukes
| music          = Michael J McEvoy
| studio         = 
| distributor    = StudioCanal
| released       = 
| runtime        = 111 minutes
| country        = United Kingdom
| language       = English
| budget         = $7 million
| gross          = $15.8 million<ref name="BOM">{{cite web |url=https://www.boxofficemojo.com/title/tt4538916/ |title='Finding Your Feet (2017) |work= Box Office Mojo |publisher=IMDb |accessdate=16 August 2022}}</ref>
}}Finding Your Feet is a 2017 British romantic comedy film directed by Richard Loncraine and written by Nick Moorcroft and Meg Leonard. The film stars Imelda Staunton, Timothy Spall, Celia Imrie, Joanna Lumley and David Hayman, and was released on 23 February 2018 in the United Kingdom.

Plot
When Sandra Abbott, Lady Abbott (Imelda Staunton) discovers that her husband of 40 years Sir Mike (John Sessions) is having an affair with her best friend Pamela (Josie Lawrence), she seeks refuge in London with her estranged, older sister Bif (Celia Imrie). Sandra is a fish out of water next to her outspoken, serial-dating, free-spirited sibling who lives on an inner-city council estate.  But difference is just what Sandra needs and she reluctantly lets Bif drag her along to a community dance class where she meets her sister's friends, Charlie (Timothy Spall), Jackie (Joanna Lumley) and Ted (David Hayman). She gradually begins to enjoy herself, even going river swimming with Bif.

Charlie is living on a narrow boat, having had to sell his house to pay for his wife’s dementia care home and tells Sandra that one day he will cross the Channel in his boat and travel the canals of France. The dance class perform in the street to raise funds for charity. An Italian dance festival promoter sees a video of the group dancing on social media and invites them all to Rome for two days. Whilst Sandra and Charlie grow closer, Bif finds out she is dying from lung cancer.   The group go to Italy and perform, even though Bif is in obvious pain. Sandra and Charlie go for a walk together and he tells her about his wife. Not wanting to be the other woman, Sandra walks away.

The following morning she finds out that Bif died during the night. They all return home and Sandra scatters Bif’s ashes in the Hampstead Heath Ponds where they swam. Her former husband meets up with her at the ash-scattering ceremony and persuades her to return home as his relationship with Pamela has fallen apart. She returns to her old home and takes up where she left off. A letter from Charlie arrives telling her his wife has died and he is off to France. Realising that she no longer wants the suburban life, Sandra leaves in the middle of her birthday party and joins Charlie on his boat.

Cast
 Imelda Staunton as Sandra
 Timothy Spall as Charlie
 Celia Imrie as Bif
 Joanna Lumley as Jackie
 David Hayman as Ted
 John Sessions as Sir Mike
 Josie Lawrence as Pamela
 Indra Ové as Corrina 
 Sian Thomas as Lilly

Production
The film was announced at the 2016 Cannes Film Festival and started shooting on 31 October 2016, in London and Rome. The film wrapped on 16 December 2016. The film was released nationwide in the United Kingdom and Ireland on 23 February 2018. Roadside Attractions picked up the U.S distribution rights at the American Film Market on 2 November 2017, planning to release the film theatrically in America on 30 March 2018.

Release
On 20 October 2017, it was announced that Finding Your Feet would open the 35th Torino Film Festival. The director Richard Loncraine, and the actors Timothy Spall and Celia Imrie presented the feature (re-titled Ricomincio da me) at the festival in Turin on 24 November 2017. TFF is the second largest film festival in Italy, following the Venice Film Festival. Finding Your Feet is distributed in Italy by CINEMA owned by veteran film distributor Valerio De Paolis.

It was announced in The Hollywood Reporter on 15 December 2017, the film will have its North American premiere at the 29th Palm Springs International Film Festival on 6 January 2018. The film was named as one of the 'best of the fest' and screened again for the public on 15 January.

Reception
Critical response
On review aggregator website Rotten Tomatoes, the film holds a fresh approval rating of 70% based on 88 reviews, with an average rating of 5.8/10. The website's critical consensus reads, "Finding Your Feet wears its heart on its sleeve, elevating undemanding material with a feel-good romance and sweet performances from its over-qualified cast." Metacritic gave the film a weighted average score of 53 out of 100, based on 15 critics, indicating "average or mixed reviews".

Australian film critic Stephen Romei of The Australian awarded the film 4 stars and said "Finding Your Feet is rightly billed as comedy-drama; yet, although it’s full of rib-tickling dialogue, it’s the drama that cuts deep". Mark Kermode reviewed the film favourably on BBC Radio 5 Live. Kevin Maher from The Times said it was "oddly adorable". Andy Lea of The Sunday Express awarded the film 4 stars and said "it’s big-hearted, touching, smartly-written and beautifully performed by a hugely talented cast". Allan Hunter said in The Daily Express that it was "a sentimental tearjerker elevated by a top-notch British cast". Linda Marric from HeyUGuys said the film was "a charming, oft-told tale of second chances in life and love, filled with fine performances." Francesca Rudkin of The New Zealand Herald compared Finding Your Feet to The Best Exotic Marigold Hotel and Calendar Girls and said the film was a charming, if somewhat predictable, crowd-pleaser about embracing life in your later years. Emma Simmonds from The List said "the joie de vivre of these convention-defying pensioners is ultimately irresistible." Louise Keller from Urban Cinefile said "Finding Your Feet may be predictable fare, but it has a heart of solid gold". James Mottram from Total Film said "Its love-in-later-life insights are well-worn, but with Staunton on song, Richard Loncraine's film mines genuine feeling". In another positive review, The Film Blog called Finding Your Feet "A Billy Elliot for Seniors with a meaningful slice of warmth and humour".

Box office
The film was released on 475 screens on 23 February in the United Kingdom and debuted at #4 in the chart grossing $1,290,495 in its opening weekend. The film went on to gross $7,891,508. The film performed equally as well in Australia and New Zealand, grossing $5.53 million. As of 13 July 2018, the film had grossed $16,881,861 million worldwide, making it one of the most successful independent British films of 2017 and 2018.

DVD and Blu-ray Release

The film was released on DVD and Blu-ray in the United Kingdom on 25 June 2018.

Following on from the film's box-office success, Finding Your Feet'' was the  no.2 film in the official U.K. DVD and Blu-ray chart, behind The Greatest Showman, which narrowly took the number-one spot. Best Picture Oscar winner, The Shape Of Water, debuted at no.5.

Awards
On 15 January 2018 the film won the Audience Award for Best Film at the Palm Springs International Film Festival.

French remake

A French remake of Finding Your Feet based on the original screenplay written by Nick Moorcroft & Meg Leonard started shooting in Paris, France, on August 10, 2020. The film, entitled "Alors On Danse" was directed, adapted by and stars Michèle Laroque and will be theatrically released by UGC nationwide in France on January 22, 2022. The film features an all-star French cast including Thierry Lhermitte, Isabelle Nanty and Jean-Hugues Anglade.

References

External links
 

2017 films
Films directed by Richard Loncraine
British romantic comedy films
2017 romantic comedy films
2010s English-language films
2010s British films